Årslev is a town in central Denmark on the island of Funen. It was located in Årslev Municipality, until 1 January 2007 when it became part of Faaborg-Midtfyn Municipality.
The town has a population of 4,193 (1 January 2022).

There is a train station (operated by DSB) and bus connections (operated by Fynbus) to Odense and Svendborg. It has two schools, which are called Sdr. Nærå Fri- og Efterskole and Broskolen Afd. Bøgehøj

Notable people 
 Valdemar Skjerning (1887 in Palleshave, Årslev Municipality – 1970) a Danish stage and film actor 
 Stine Nielsen (born 1991 in Årslev) a Danish sports shooter. She competed at the 2012 Summer Olympics
 Alexander Bah, footballer

External links
Faaborg-Midtfyn municipality

References

Aarslev
Faaborg-Midtfyn Municipality
Populated places in Funen